Otabek Valizhonov (born 10 May 1984), sometimes spelled as Otabek Valijonov, is an Uzbek footballer who plays as an attacking midfielder or second striker for Bangladesh Premier League side Sheikh Jamal DC. He is a versatile playmaker who can play in various positions of forward line.

Club career

In Bangladesh
In 2018, Otabek joined his first club outside of Uzbekistan when he joined Bangladesh Premier League side Team BJMC. He scored 6 goals in 21 matches with BJMC in his first league season, but couldn't save his team from relegation.

In 2019, Otabek joined Brothers Union from same league. He scored 3 goals playing 5 matches in 2019–20 league before the league was cancelled due to COVID-19 pandemic in Bangladesh. 

In 2020, Otabek moved to Sheikh Jamal DC, one of the top clubs of Bangladesh. He scored 7 goals in the Premier League in 22 matches in his first season with the club. In the next season, he scored same amount of league goals playing two matches less.

References

Uzbekistani footballers
Living people
1984 births
Sheikh Jamal Dhanmondi Club players
Navbahor Namangan players
FC Shurtan Guzar players
FK Andijon players
PFK Nurafshon players
FC AGMK players
FC Sogdiana Jizzakh players
Team BJMC players
Brothers Union players
Bangladesh Football Premier League players
Expatriate footballers in Bangladesh